Giacomo Properzj Incisa Beccaria di Santo Stefano (13 March 1939 – 9 January 2022) was an Italian politician. A member of the Italian Republican Party, he served as president of the Province of Milan from 1990 to 1992. Properzj died in Milan on 9 January 2022, at the age of 82.

References

1939 births
2022 deaths
Italian Republican Party politicians
Presidents of the Province of Milan
20th-century Italian politicians
21st-century Italian politicians
20th-century Italian journalists
21st-century Italian journalists
University of Milan alumni
Politicians from Milan